Torodora fuscobasalis is a moth in the family Lecithoceridae. It was described by Kyu-Tek Park in 2002. It is found in Thailand.

The wingspan is about 17 mm. The forewings are dark brown before the antemedian line, which is bordered by creamy-white scales and followed by a pale brownish-grey area. The discal spot is relatively large and found near the upper angle of the cell. There is also a triangular greyish-orange costal spot at four-fifths. The hindwings are grey.

Etymology
The species name refers to the dark brown basal half of the forewings and is derived from Latin fusc (meaning brown).

References

Moths described in 2002
Torodora